Paconius is a monotypic snout moth genus described by Carl Heinrich in 1956. Its only species, Paconius corniculatus, described in the same article, is found in the US territory of Puerto Rico.

References

Pyralidae genera
Phycitinae
Monotypic moth genera
Moths of the Caribbean
Taxa named by Carl Heinrich